Omaha is an unincorporated community in Putnam County, in the U.S. state of Missouri.

History
The first permanent settlement at Omaha was made in 1845. A post office called Omaha was established in 1860, and remained in operation until 1908. The name "Omaha" was assigned by postal officials.

References

Unincorporated communities in Putnam County, Missouri
Unincorporated communities in Missouri